Roger Steare is a British ethicist and corporate philosopher.

Career

Steare's early career included roles as a social worker and banker, and ten years as chief executive of a recruitment company.

He is now Honorary Visiting Professor of Organisational Ethics, and Corporate Philosopher in Residence at the Cass Business School in London. He teaches on the Executive MBA Programs as well as consulting with external corporate clients through Cass Executive Education.

He is also a fellow of the cross-party policy think tank, ResPublica founded by Phillip Blond in 2009. Steare's essay on The Power of Love in Business was included in ResPublica's "Changing The Debate: The Ideas Redefining Britain".

Steare was a member of the Expert Drafting Committee for Rights and Humanity, invited by the British Government to prepare recommendations for the G20 London Summit in April 2009.

In collaboration with Athens-based chartered psychologist Pavlos Stamboulides, Steare conducts empirical research on moral character, judgement and behaviour. Some of this research was published in The Times in October 2010, in a speech by Hector Sants of the Financial Services Authority in 2010, by PwC UK in 2010, and in The challenges of risk, culture, behaviour and 
corporate integrity in financial services for EY in 2017. He is co-designer of the psychometric profile MoralDNA, used to measure moral values.

Steare is the author of Ethicability, first published in 2006 and now in its 5th edition, and of Thinking Outside the Inbox, published in 2019. He is a regular contributor to Chartered Banker magazine in which he challenges the "dysfunctional totalitarian construct" of modern corporations, In July 2020, he became a columnist for the Financial Times.

On 22 July 2012, he was a guest on the BBC World Service's "In the Balance" programme, in an episode entitled Holding Companies to Account.

In 2014, Steare was appointed Visiting Professor of European Studies at the College of Europe, Bruges. He is a Fellow of the Royal Society of Arts.

Steare has developed programs in leadership, ethics and corporate responsibility for organisations including BP, Citigroup, HSBC, PwC, the Financial Services Authority and the Serious Fraud Office.

Following the Deepwater Horizon oil spill in 2010, BP incorporated Steare's ethicability RIGHT framework for ethical decision-making into the BP 2011 Code of Conduct.

The Financial Times profiled Steare in 2012 and has more than once cited his definition of corporate culture as "the way human beings behave together — what they value and what they celebrate". In March 2018, Steare was featured in The Guardian in an article profiling the role of philosophers in business.

Bibliography

Papers

References

External links 
 
 In the Balance – Holding Companies to Account on BBC iPlayer
  Not Only What You Do, But How You Do It: A View from the Top - Video interview

British philosophers
1958 births
Living people
Alumni of Bedford College, London
Academics of Bayes Business School
Psychometricians
British bankers
British ethicists
British chief executives
Academic staff of the College of Europe